The Q1 Mall or Infra Q1 is an upcoming, under construction business cum lifestyle mall in Kochi, India. The mall is developed and promoted by Nippon Infra Projects Pvt.

Q1 Mall is located between Pipeline and Vytilla, two major junctions in NH 66.

Facilities
The mall is divided into three sections: Q1 Galleria, Q1 Terrace and Q1 Business Zone. The Galleria and Terrace are part of the retail area which is spread over five floors. The rest of the ten floors form the Business Zone where the offices are located. There is car parking on each floor which can hold thirty cars per floor. There 260 parking spaces for cars on two levels of parking at the basement.

The structure is earthquake resistant to zone-3. The mall will be fully IBS enabled.

References

Shopping malls in Kochi
Buildings and structures under construction in India